Francisco Alía Miranda (born 1960) is a Spanish historian. He has focused on the study of 20th century Spanish history. He has also published works dealing with the methodology of history.

A senior lecturer at the University of Castilla–La Mancha (UCLM), he has been employed by the UCLM since 1988.

He was appointed as full professor at the UCLM in 2019.

Works 
Authored books

References 
Citations

Bibliography
 
 
 
 
 
 

Historians of the Spanish Civil War
1960 births
Academic staff of the University of Castilla–La Mancha
Complutense University of Madrid alumni
Living people